Jordan Jacob Jankowski (born May 17, 1989) is an American former professional baseball pitcher. He previously played in Major League Baseball (MLB) for the Houston Astros.

Career

Houston Astros

Jankowski was drafted twice by the Houston Astros, in the 34th round of the 2008 MLB Draft from Peters Township High School and again in the 34th round of the 2012 MLB Draft out of Catawba College. He signed on June 12, 2012. He began his professional career with the rookie league Greeneville Astros in 2012 and then played in Class-A with the Quad Cities River Bandits and Lancaster JetHawks in 2013. He spent all of 2014 with the Corpus Christi Hooks of the Texas League and spent 2015 and 2016 with the Fresno Grizzlies of the Class-AAA Pacific Coast League.

After beginning the 2017 season back in Fresno, Jankowski was called up to the majors for the first time on May 22, 2017.  He made his MLB debut for the Astros on May 24 against the Detroit Tigers, allowing two runs in one inning of work. In his second appearance, on May 29 against the Minnesota Twins, he allowed four runs in 2  innings but was credited with his first win. On August 2, he made a third appearance, pitching a scoreless inning against the Tampa Bay Rays.

Los Angeles Dodgers
On August 20, Jankowski was claimed off waivers by the Los Angeles Dodgers. He was designated for assignment on September 2 after just a few games with the Oklahoma City Dodgers. He was released by the Dodgers prior to the 2018 season.

Los Angeles Angels
On April 9, 2018, Jankowski signed a minor-league contract with the Los Angeles Angels. He was released on May 25, 2018.

References

External links

1989 births
Living people
Baseball players from Pennsylvania
Major League Baseball pitchers
Houston Astros players
Catawba Indians baseball players
Greeneville Astros players
Quad Cities River Bandits players
Lancaster JetHawks players
Corpus Christi Hooks players
Fresno Grizzlies players
Criollos de Caguas players
Leones del Escogido players
American expatriate baseball players in the Dominican Republic
Gigantes del Cibao players
Oklahoma City Dodgers players
Salt Lake Bees players
Liga de Béisbol Profesional Roberto Clemente pitchers